The 2022 Acropolis International Tournament is a basketball tournament which was held in OAKA Olympic Indoor Hall in Athens, Greece, from August 17. until August 19, 2022. It was the 31st edition of the Acropolis International Basketball Tournament. The competition is played under FIBA rules as a round-robin tournament. The four participating teams were Greece, Poland, Turkey, and Georgia

Venues

Participating teams

Standings 

|-bgcolor="gold"

|}

Results 
All times are local Central European Summer Time (UTC+2).

Final standing

References

External links
Hellenic Basketball Federation Official Website 
Basket.gr Acropolis Cup History Search Results 
Acropolis Cup 2022 Official Stat 
Acropolis Cup 

Acropolis International Basketball Tournament
Acropolis International
2022 in Greek sport
2021–22 in Greek basketball